The Impuls 17 is a German high-wing, single-place, hang glider that was designed and produced by Impuls of Munich.

The aircraft is no longer in production.

Design and development
The Impuls 17 was designed as a beginner and school wing for flight training and is certified as DHV Class 2.

The aircraft is made from aluminum tubing, with the wing covered in Dacron sailcloth. Its  span wing is cable braced from a single kingpost. The nose angle is 120° and the aspect ratio is 5.7:1.

Specifications (17)

References

Hang gliders